The Cheshire Military Museum is a military museum in Chester, Cheshire, England.

History
The museum has been housed in the former A Block in Chester Castle since 1972. It covers the history of four British Army regiments connected with the County of Cheshire from 1685 onwards: the Cheshire Regiment, the Cheshire Yeomanry, the 3rd Carabiniers, the 5th Royal Inniskilling Dragoon Guards, and also the Eaton Hall Officer Cadet School. The building is recorded in the National Heritage List for England as a designated Grade I listed building.

See also

Grade I listed buildings in Cheshire West and Chester
 List of museums in Cheshire

References

External links 
 Museum website

Museums in Chester
Military and war museums in England
Grade I listed buildings in Cheshire
Regimental museums in England